At least two warships of Japan have been named Narushio:

, an  launched in 1972 and struck in 1993.
, an  launched in 2001

Japanese Navy ship names
Japan Maritime Self-Defense Force ship names